Maria Hjertner (born 3 July 1996) is a Norwegian handball player who plays for Larvik HK.

She is also a part of Norway's national recruit team in handball.

She also represented Norway at the 2014 Women's Youth World Handball Championship, placing 13th, at the 2015 Women's Under-19 European Handball Championship, placing 6th and at the 2013 Youth European Championship, placing 7th.

References

1996 births
Living people
Sportspeople from Trondheim
Norwegian female handball players
21st-century Norwegian women